Cassandra Magrath (born 1981) is an Australian actress.  She played Miranda Gibson in the Australian ABC 1998–2000 television series SeaChange and Liz Hunter in the 2005 Australian horror film Wolf Creek.

Acting career
Magrath began her acting career aged 11, with a role in the children's television programme Ocean Girl. She also played Charlene in the Australian ABC children's television series The Wayne Manifesto that aired in 1996. Magrath also acted as Alison Pi Renfrey in The Crash Zone in 1998. She also appears in The Butterfly Effect video 'Gone', as well as comedy trio Tripod's 'Xbox Song'. Magrath stars in the Michael Adante thriller Vanished in which she portrayed Winona Grant. In 2016 she starred in Screen Australia's horror film Scare Campaign, directed by the Cairnes brothers (100 Bloody Acres).

Filmography

Notes

External links

 Wolf Creek Interview at Future Movies

1981 births
Living people
Actresses from Melbourne
Australian child actresses
Australian film actresses
Australian television actresses
20th-century Australian actresses
21st-century Australian actresses